Empress Dowager Chengtian may refer to:

Xiao Yanyan (953–1009), empress and regent of the Liao dynasty
Yelü Pusuwan (died 1177), regent of Qara Khitai (Western Liao)